Underhill Methodist Church (also known as Brackenbury Memorial Church) is a Methodist Church, opened in 1899, located in Fortuneswell, on the Isle of Portland, Dorset. It was built between 1898–1899, replacing a 1793 chapel built by Robert Carr Brackenbury, the founder of Methodism on Portland. The church remains active to date, as part of the Portland Methodist Circuit, alongside Easton Methodist Church.

History

Brackenbury's original chapel (1793)

Robert Carr Brackenbury came to Portland in 1791. He purchased a house on the island, and alongside Mr George Smith, began to preach from his own residence. Soon a Methodist following was established. During that same year Brackenbury built a chapel at his expense within Fortuneswell. It opened by 1793, and had 120 members.

During 1794 Brackenbury aimed to increase members at Tophill, and purchased a house for use as a chapel within Wakeham. After Brackenbury died in 1818, his wife had the first purpose-built chapel constructed at Tophill in 1825. During the first half of the 19th century, the construction of new schools were essential on Portland, and a Wesleyan School at Fortunewell was built for 200 children in 1841. It opened in May 1845. It took the same name as the chapel, becoming the Brackenbury Day School.

Construction of Underhill Methodist Church (1898–1899)
The 19th-century construction of Portland Harbour's Breakwaters, and the other associated works, led to a large increase within Portland's population. Brackenbury's chapel had become too small and fallen into a poor condition by this time. It was decided that a new church should be built, and was to be called Brackenbury Memorial Church. The foundation stones were laid in 1898, and the church was completed by 1899. The church cost over £3,200 to build, and was declared open in 1899 for Divine Service on Whit Monday.

In 1903 Brackenbury's original chapel was demolished, and the new Wesleyan manse erected on the same site. This was Brackenbury House, located just below the new church. The increasing Methodist population on the island led to the Tophill's Easton Methodist Church being built between 1906–07.

With the outbreak of World War II, Portland was a natural target for German aircraft, due to the importance of island's naval base. On 11 August 1940 the church was damaged by bombing. During the late 1990s renovations were carried out on the church. The church, still active today as part of the Portland Methodist Circuit, has Revd Christopher Briggs as the current minister.

References

External links
 Dorset South and West Methodist Circuit website

Isle of Portland
Churches in Dorset
1899 establishments in England
Methodist churches in Dorset